SM Mall of Asia, also abbreviated as SM MoA, or simply Mall of Asia or MoA, is a large shopping mall in the Philippines, located at Bay City, Pasay, Philippines, within the SM Central Business Park, a reclaimed area within Manila Bay, and the southern end of Epifanio de los Santos Avenue (EDSA).

The area attracts a daily average foot traffic of about 200,000 people.

The mall is currently the largest shopping mall in the Philippines and the third in the world. When it opened in 2006, it was the largest shopping mall in the Philippines until SM North EDSA was redeveloped in 2008, and was relegated to third place by the expansion of SM Megamall from 2011 to 2015 when SM Seaside opened to the public before returning to this spot in 2017. It later became the largest shopping mall in the Philippines starting 2021, following the opening of IKEA Pasay City, the first IKEA store in the country and the largest IKEA store in the world, at the mall's complex.

Following the mall's opening in 2006, it caused several smaller shopping malls nearby to close, such as the Pearl Plaza and the Uniwide Coastal Mall, both located in Tambo, Parañaque. However, this is changing with the rise of other malls and similar structures such as the Ayala Malls Manila Bay and W Mall.

Construction

Plans for SM Mall of Asia began in 1995, with construction originally slated to begin in January 1996; it was marketed to become the largest shopping mall in the world upon completion.

The mall is the centerpiece project of SM Prime Holdings at the SM Central Business Park, where five one-story buildings serve as the company's corporate offices, while the sixth building is being occupied by TeleTech Holdings, Inc. as their flagship site in the country.

The SM Mall of Asia's design team includes Arquitectonica as the projects design architect and Architect Robert Carag Ong, Architect of Record, and GHT Services as the complex's project managers. SM tapped two separate construction firms for the construction of the mall: Hilmarc's Construction Corp. for the South Parking Building, Main Mall, and Entertainment Mall; and Monolith Construction Development Corp. for the North Parking Building. The mall would have opened before Christmas Day of 2005 but had been delayed due to hitches in the delivery of construction materials. Frequent rains in the last quarter of 2005 also delayed the turnover of mall space to tenants. Due to these circumstances, SM Prime decided to move the opening date to March 3, 2006.

On February 27, 2006, local newspaper Manila Standard Today reported that a team of Pasay city engineers found huge cracks underneath the structure, which was causing the structure to vibrate. When questioned about the inspection, the Pasay city engineering department denied making any statement regarding defects in the Mall of Asia. Engineer Edwin Javaluyas, Pasay city engineering officer, in his letter to SM Prime Holdings Inc., said he never stated that the city hall's engineering department inspected the Mall of Asia on February 23, 2006.

SM Prime, however, decided to move the opening to May 21 of that year. Jeffrey Lim, corporate information officer of SM Prime Holdings, emphasized that a rescheduling of the mall's opening was made to give the company an opportunity to allow more tenants to open shops and denied that the change was due to structural defects.

The mall was officially inaugurated by President Gloria Macapagal-Arroyo with a special screening of Everest at the San Miguel Coca-Cola IMAX Theater. The movie was shown three days after Philippine tri-athlete Leo Oracion reached the summit of the world's highest mountain.

Layout
The Mall of Asia consists of four buildings interconnected by walkways and elevated pathways: the Main Mall, the Entertainment Mall, and the North and South Wing Parking Buildings.

The Main Mall includes numerous shopping and dining establishments and the food court. The Entertainment Mall is a two-story complex, most of which is open-air, and also features some shopping and dining businesses. The Entertainment Mall also hosts the Music Hall, an events hall (formerly open-air, now airconditioned) facing Manila Bay. As of late 2021, majority of the area has been renovated with addition of air-conditioning. Due to the mall's size, all buildings have concierge desks, assisting local information within the area.

The mall's 5,000 parking spaces are divided across two, six-story parking buildings conveniently designated the North and South Parking Buildings, which have been covered with a solar rooftop. The South Parking Building houses the mall's official The SM Store, while the mall's supermarket, the SM Hypermarket is located at the North Parking Building. Since 2016, these parking buildings are equipped with elevators and escalators, which allow fast access to parking levels.

Since its opening in 2006, visitors to the mall have been welcomed by large steel framed globe on a roundabout at the southern tip of Epifanio de los Santos Avenue (EDSA), known as the MoA Globe. In 2009, the globe was turned into Globamaze, an LED display.

MOA globe publicity stunt

On November 13, 2021, the iconic globe was reportedly stolen by a helicopter that was recorded by a delivery rider at 11:00 p.m. on the previous day.

The Pasay City police issued a statement that the globe was not stolen and was just "undergoing maintenance for marketing strategy". The globe was covered in scaffolding. The mall management released a statement a day later that the globe is "back" and revealed that the supposed theft was staged as part of a publicity stunt to promote the Netflix film, Red Notice. The marketing promotion caused the globe to be a trending subject on Twitter including internet memes with scenes from the animated film Despicable Me, Netflix web series Squid Game and the music video of Wrecking Ball by Miley Cyrus.

Features

The mall includes branches of all of the standard anchor stores found in most of the SM Supermalls. The first-ever branch of Taste Asia, one of the SM Supermalls' food court brands, is located right outside the mall's supermarket, the sprawling SM Hypermarket.

The mall's open-air Music Hall directly facing Manila Bay has also held numerous events, contests, and concerts since the mall's opening in 2006.

The mall also provides office space. Dell International Services, a subsidiary of Dell, Inc. once occupied a  area at the second floor of the North Parking Building of the mall. Eventually, in 2015, Teleperformance took over that space until 2019, as the company moved its operations to the MOA Annex Building. Currently, the site has been replaced by the mall anchor Cyberzone for IT-related shops, one of the biggest Cyberzones in the country since the opening of SM City North EDSA.

MoA Food Hall
Opened on February 12, 2020, the new Food Hall is located in the 3rd Level, across SM Skating Rink at the main mall. Replacing the former SM Food Court at the second floor, it features budget to upscale dining choices.

SM Game Park
A replacement of SM Bowling Center, it is located at the 3rd Level of the South Entertainment Mall. It is set to be operational on May 2023. Similar to its branch in SM Southmall, it will feature bowling, billiards, and other sports facilities.

SM Skating Rink

The mall features the Philippines' first Olympic-sized ice skating rink which is located on the third level of the mall's main building.

An older ice skating rink was one of the main features of the SM Mall of Asia at the time of its inauguration in 2006, which was situated at the ground level of the mall's main building. Its opening followed the closure of the old skating rink at the SM Megamall which was built in 1992. On 2015, the skating rink made a comeback and eventually opened at the SM Megamall, and during the mall's renovation works, the skating rink was temporarily moved from 2015–2017 to the open area lot between the SMX Convention Center and the MOA Arena, which is currently occupied by MOA Square, which houses IKEA Pasay City. The new skating rink, located at the 3rd floor, was opened in 2017.

Several ice skating competitions have been held at the mall's ice skating rink such as the Skate Asia 2007, the first time an international competition at that scale was held in the Philippines. The ice hockey competition of the 2019 Southeast Asian Games was also held in the venue.

SM Cinema
The mall features a total of 16 cinemas with 11 regular cinemas (including Center Stage Cinema), three Director's Club Cinemas, one Event Cinema, and one IMAX Theater. It originally featured a total of 10 cinemas, with six regular cinemas, Director's Club Cinema for intimate screenings (30 La-Z-Boy seats), Premier Cinema, CenterStage which can use for live musical concerts and theatrical performances, and an IMAX theater.

IMAX
One of the mall's main attractions is the first ever and the largest IMAX theater in the Philippines. Originally with the naming rights of San Miguel-Coca-Cola, IMAX Theatre is one of the world's biggest IMAX screens in 3D including 2D screenings. It was originally a traditional film projector that uses its 15/70 mm film format, IMAX GT (Grand Theatre). The IMAX Theater was closed on October 11, 2013, for digital conversion, and re-opened on October 30, 2013, along with the release of Thor: The Dark World. On November 6, 2014, the old traditional 70mm IMAX projector was used for Christopher Nolan's Interstellar. In July 2017, the main lobby was temporarily closed for renovation (where the XD Cinema is going to be demolished), and its lobby was temporarily moved at the second floor in front of Cinemas 7 and 8, the main lobby re-opened on December 11, 2018, upon the launch of Event Cinema and the Asian premiere screening of Aquaman where its star Jason Momoa has arrived in the country; however, its temporary lobby is closed being used as offices for cinema personnel and as an emergency fire exit. On August 18, 2019, the IMAX Theater was closed for renovation and re-opened on October 29, 2019, with updated interiors and high-end spectator seats with comfortable Paragon 918 chairs from world-class spectator seats manufacturer Ferco Seating. The IMAX re-opened on May 4, 2022, along with the release of Doctor Strange in the Multiverse of Madness.

Expansion and redevelopment
Additional cinemas were opened in the mall since 2016. Two digital theaters (C7 and C8) were opened at the north side of the entertainment mall in December 2016. The Event Cinema was opened on December 12, 2018, and located at the newly renovated IMAX theater lobby, which can be used for birthday parties, corporate events, and seminars, and it can house up to 45 people.

Half of the original cinema area (including Cinemas 4–6, Director's Club and Premier Cinema) was closed on August 22, 2018, after the celebration of the 2nd Pista ng Pelikulang Pilipino and were demolished for renovation as part of the mall expansion, New Cinemas 1-5 re-opened on soft opening in December 2019 along with the limited-early release of Star Wars: The Rise of Skywalker, while the other remaining cinemas, the three Director's Club Cinemas equipped with Dolby Atmos and laser projector were re-opened on its grand re-launch on January 22, 2020, at the former space of Premier Cinema. Cinemas 9–11, which are former Cinemas 1-3 remained in temporary operations after the re-opening of the renovated theaters. The former space of the Director's Club Cinema is now occupied by Surplus Shop.

As part of the mall's continuing expansion in the North Wing, the original cinemas including the centerstage were temporarily closed.

Mall expansion and redevelopments
The SM Mall of Asia is undergoing a  expansion project since 2014, featuring new expansion areas for retail establishments and new indoor and outdoor amenities, including a football field and the installation of roof solar panels at the mall.

Main Mall complex
A new two-level expansion will be built at the top of the main mall which is now currently undergoing construction and is expected to be fully complete by 2023. The expansion wings will connect to the mall carpark buildings.

The new expansion will feature a football pitch with grandstand, botanical gardens, and parks at the mall's 4th level roofdeck plus all-new shops and restaurants at the mall's third, and fourth levels. It will be built in phases. The first phase will feature the new Olympic-sized Ice Skating Rink and a Food Hall (replacing the old Foodcourt) on the 3rd Floor along with more new shops and restaurants. Both of the new features, the mall's ice skating rink and most recently, the MoA Food Hall, were completed in 2017 and February 2020 respectively. As of 2022, half of the expanded Main Atrium has been completed, which will soon connect to the rest of the mall. Works for the remaining untouched parts of the mall especially in the North Wing are currently on-going.

A new wing connecting The Galeon Museum and the north side of Entertainment Mall was opened which features restaurants in the ground floor and the new Cinemas 7 and 8 in the 2nd floor.

The estimated gross floor area of the expansion project would be , upon full completion.

The Galeón museum

The Galeón is a dome-shaped museum that will feature the history of the Manila Galleon trade system, in which (over a period of 250 years) the Philippines and Mexico played major roles. The main attraction will be the Galleon ship which was used for trading.

The grand opening has been delayed for some time, while the entrance to the museum is occupied by various restaurants.

Former features

The Exploreum
The Exploreum was a science and technology museum within the main SM Mall of Asia shopping mall complex. A  joint venture between SM Prime Holdings and United-States-based Leisure Entertainment Consultancy (LEC), it opened in 2007 as the SM Science Discovery Center. It featured a digital planetarium and a wide range of technology and science-themed exhibits.

In 2009, it was renamed into Nido Fortified Science Discovery Center as SM Prime Holdings partnered with Nido Fortified, a milk brand of Nestlé.

In 2014, Nido Fortified Science Discovery Center was rebranded to The Exploreum, which featured 118 new interactive exhibits and over 100 non-interactive exhibits in eight major interactive galleries namely the Natural World, Human Adventure, Zoom, Connect, Cyberville, Space Camp, the Living Earth, and Science Park.

Exploreum was closed in 2017 as a part of the mall expansion.

XD Cinema
The XD Cinema was a 4D theater located at the IMAX lobby at the ground floor, opened on November 25, 2014, on soft opening equipped with strategically located 48 pneumatic controlled seats that highlight the immersive nature of the theater while maintaining an exclusive ambiance to delight the audience, it has enormous in-theatre effects including snow, wind, water, scent, fog, and strobe/lightings. It also has leg tickler, motion seats, seat vibrators, and seat impactors to add a breathtaking fourth dimension experience. The first local film to be shown in this theater is Feng Shui 2 starring Kris Aquino and Coco Martin.

The XD Cinema was closed in April 2017 for ongoing renovation works of the IMAX lobby. It has since been permanently closed, with no plans for its return.

Premier Cinema
Premier Cinema was closed on August 22, 2018, for renovation works and was now occupied by three Director's Club Cinemas.

SM Central Business Park
The SM Central Business Park is a  mixed-use area located within the surrounding areas of SM Mall of Asia, and is owned and developed by SM Prime Holdings. The complex serves as one of Henry Sy's vision to build a landmark within Metro Manila, and currently features events venues, mixed-use buildings, office towers, hotels, residential condominiums, and transport hubs.

Sporting and event venues

SM Mall of Asia Arena

The SM Mall of Asia Arena is an indoor arena within the SM Mall of Asia complex which has a seating capacity of 16,000 and a full house capacity of 20,000, which opened to the public on June 16, 2012. The arena is the alternative venue of the Philippine Basketball Association and the main venue of the University Athletic Association of the Philippines.

Concert Grounds

The Mall of Asia concert grounds, also called the Mall of Asia parking grounds when there is no event, are public spaces located west of the E-com Center buildings that are used to hold mass gatherings, primarily concerts. When there is no event, the venue is used as a parking lot to accommodate employees of the E-com Center buildings, as well as mall guests. The concert grounds comprise two complex blocks: one that can accommodate about 30,000 persons, and another that will bring the capacity to about 80,000.

The venue was the site of the Close-Up Forever Summer concert deaths that occurred in May 2016.

Amidst the COVID-19 pandemic in the Philippines which led cinemas to be closed since March 2020, SM Cinema opened up a drive-in cinema at this venue on September 9, 2020. It is the second drive-in-cinema in the country after SM City Pampanga.

SMX Convention Center Manila

The SMX Convention Center Manila (formerly Maitrade Expo and Convention Center) (Project Name: MAITrade) is the Philippines' largest privately run exhibition and convention center.

The groundbreaking was held on March 23, 2006. The  project was completed and inaugurated on November 5, 2007. It is used as an alternate with the nearby state-run Philippine International Convention Center and World Trade Center Metro Manila located in the CCP Complex. featuring large exhibition areas and function rooms. The convention center can fit approximately 6,000 people.

The Architect, Arch. Jose Siao Ling, designed the structure maximizing the use of space, giving exhibitors flexibility, and options in terms of their specific area requirements. Commercial shops are located along the perimeter. Bridgeways on the second level connect SMX Convention Center to the mall's south parking building, S Maison, MOA Square, and National University MOA, respectively.

Esplanade

An esplanade was constructed at the back of the mall where it served as the observation center for the First World Pyro Olympics in December 2005. The second World Pyro Olympics were held at the SM Mall of Asia's boardwalk area in early January, 2007.

The Esplanade was also the venue for Lovapalooza 2, wherein more than 5,300 couples kissed for 10 seconds on February 10, 2007, breaking Hungary's 4,445 in the Guinness World Records. Also, an events venue named One Esplanade was constructed here. One Esplanade is usually used for product launches, parties, and other events.

SM by the Bay Amusement Park is an amusement park situated along Manila Bay that opened to the public in 2011. It has 36 air-conditioned gondolas, each able to carry up to six persons, giving a maximum capacity of 216 passengers. The Area also houses food stalls and offers a direct view to Manila Bay.

Archdiocesan Shrine of Jesus The Way, The Truth, and The Life

The Archdiocesan Shrine of Jesus The Way, The Truth, and The Life is a Roman Catholic Church belonging to the Archdiocese of Manila located along Coral Way. It features a romanesque architecture. Dedicated to Jesus, it was envisioned by Pope John Paul II when he visited the Philippines in 1995 for the World Youth Day. The land and the church were donated and built by Henry Sy and his wife Felicidad Sy. It was consecrated and dedicated on July 9, 1999, by Manila Archbishop Jaime Cardinal Sin with Apostolic Nuncio of the Philippines Archbishop Antonio Franco, Cebu Archbishop Ricardo Cardinal Vidal, and the archbishops and bishops of the Philippines.

Casa Ibarra MOA
The Casa Ibarra MOA is an events venue located along Coral Way and the Coral Way Parking Lot. The building is owned by Ibarra's Party Venues, an events venues owner and a catering services company.

Retail Buildings

LUXE Duty Free Mall of Asia
The LUXE Duty Free Mall of Asia is a duty-free shop located along J. W. Diokno Boulevard and across the planned Six E-com Center. The shopping complex was formerly the SMDC Showroom Building, which was completed in 2011 before renovation works began in late 2016. The mall is currently operated by Duty Free Philippines Corporation (DFPC) and opened its doors in late 2018, which were graced by Tourism Secretary Bernadette Romulo-Puyat, SMDC Chairman and CEO Henry Sy Jr., and other high-ranking officials.

Mixed-Use Buildings

Mall of Asia Arena Annex Building
The Mall of Asia Annex (MAAX) Building is a 12-storey office building, located across the Mall of Asia Arena. The 12-floor building has 6-level multi parking spaces capable of storing 1,400 cars, shops, restaurants, and SM Supermarket, which opened on March 24, 2019, and is located at the ground floor. The building also houses The Food Village, a food court complex featuring Filipino and international dining areas. The building's office tenants within the building's 3 upper floors are SM Prime, the Philippine Skating Union, and Teleperformance.

MoA Square
MoA Square is an expansion building to SM Mall of Asia that houses IKEA Pasay City, unique home living stores and concepts, in-house contact center, an e-commerce facility, restaurants, a warehouse, and additional parking spaces. Costing , it is located between the SMX Convention Center and Mall of Asia Arena and is interconnected with the mall's South Parking Building. The construction for the building began in September 2018 and topped off in 2020. It opened on November 24, 2021.

The branch was expected to open in 2020, but was delayed due to the COVID-19 pandemic. The branch opened on November 25, 2021. The opening of IKEA made SM Mall of Asia the largest mall in the Philippines once again; the last time was from 2006 to 2008.

National University Mall of Asia
The National University Mall of Asia, also known as NU MOA or NUMA, is the satellite campus of the Manila-based university, also owned mostly by SM Investments, located along Coral Way. The campus occupies the Mall of Asia Arena Annex (MAAX) Building 2, a 7-storey building located beside Microtel by Windham Mall of Asia and is directly connected to the SMX Convention Center Manila. The building opened on September 17, 2019, hosting the NU Senior High School, NU College of Optometry, and the NU College of Dentistry (extension to the Manila campus), which offers courses such as the Doctor of Dental Medicine, Dental Hygiene and Dental Laboratory Technology. The campus also offers courses, ranging from Bachelor of Business Administration majoring in Financial and Entrepreneurial Management, Bachelor of Science in both Medical and Information Technology, and Bachelor of Science in psychology.

Oceanaire Luxurious Residences
The Oceanaire Luxurious Residences is a 15-storey two tower development owned by Zhongfa Development, Inc. located along Sunrise Drive, which was completed during the 4th quarter of 2015. The condominium is also occupied by the Golden Phoenix Hotel Manila, a 281-room 4-star hotel, making the complex the second hotel to open in the area, and features a bar and a spa, located within the amenity area of the building.

Hotels

Microtel by Windham Mall of Asia
The Microtel by Windham Mall of Asia is a 150-room hotel located along Coral Way, and beside Conrad Manila. The hotel opened in 2010 and serves as the first hotel in the complex, before the opening of the Conrad Manila in June 2016, and features the Millie's All-day dining restaurant, a function room with a maximum capacity of up to 200 persons, and a roofdeck swimming pool.

Conrad Manila

The Mall of Asia Complex also host the Conrad Manila, a 347-room hotel located between the SMX Convention Center and the Esplanade. The hotel serves as the complex's premier class hotel. Its podium houses the S Maison, a 2-storey retail area and the Dessert Museum, a candy-themed art exhibition. The S Maison is considered by SM Prime Holdings a separate mall from the main SM Mall of Asia shopping mall complex as the mall targets the upper income levels, and is designated as the 62nd SM Supermall in the Philippines.

Hotel 101 Manila
The Hotel 101 Manila is a 518-room 3-star hotel located within EDSA Extension. Groundbreaking began in June 2012, and was opened in July 2016. The hotel is owned by Hotel of Asia, Inc., a subsidiary of the DoubleDragon Properties and serves as Hotel 101's first and flagship hotel in the country, featuring a swimming pool and Jacuzzi, located at the 2nd floor.

Tryp by Windham Manila
The Tryp Manila, owned by Windham, is located beside The Esplanade, and across the Three E-Com Center. The hotel is completed in 2018 serves as the third hotel located in the complex owned by SM Prime Holdings, after Conrad Manila and Microtel by Windham Mall of Asia, but offers lower rates and features 191 rooms and 3 restaurants, namely the Milagritos, the Encaramada pool bar, and the Beberitos lobby lounge.

Lanson Place Mall of Asia
The Lanson Place Mall of Asia is a hotel and service suite building located across the Galeon complex and the One Ecom Center, and sits on the westernmost area of the Concert Grounds. It serves as the first Lanson Place in the country and features 250 hotel rooms and 150 serviced suites units, featuring a sleek and contemporary architectural style. The building serves as the fourth hotel owned by SM in the complex and also features a rooftop swimming pool, an al-fresco center on the ground floor, a fitness center, an all-day dining restaurant, and a ballroom that can accommodate 800 people. The building is currently topped off in August 2021, and is expected to be completed and open its doors in 2022.

Office buildings
The SM Mall of Asia complex hosts the SM Corporate Offices, the NexGen Tower, the Philflex Bay Center, the SM Retail HQ tower, and the E-com Center, an office building complex which houses mainly business process outsourcing, cruising companies, and shipping firms. The buildings are designed by international firm Arquitectonica and Architect Felix Lim. It is divided into five smaller, different towers, namely: One E-Com Center, Two E-Com Center, Three E-Com Center, Four E-Com Center, and Five E-Com Center. The sixth tower, the Six E-com Center, is currently being planned, located in an open parking lot between the SM Mall of Asia North Wing Building and the Five Ecom Center. The buildings are connected to the main mall via elevated pedestrian bridgeway on the second level, and all buildings also features an open-air podium with dining areas located in the fourth floor of each building.

The groundbreaking for the first building, the One E-Com Center began in March 2006. The building was completed in the first week of October 2007. Its first occupant, Fitness First opened its doors on October 12, 2007, other occupants include APL, Charlex International Corporation, CMA CGM, Conduent, Damco Philippines Inc., EXL Service, Highlands Prime Inc., and MegaLink, Inc..

The Two E-com Center is a 15-storey twin tower complex with prism-like building designs. Completed in 2011, The building primarily houses SM Development Corporation, Anscor Swire Ship Management Corporation, Belle Corporation, Ben Line Agencies Philippines, Inc., Concentrix, Klaveness Maritime Agency Incorporated, MicroSourcing, OOCL, TTEC, and other outsourcing and shipping companies.

In 2018, the Three E-Com Center was launched and opened. It consists of two 15-storey semi-circular towers while the Four E-Com Center consists of three 15-storey towers with a crystal-like architectural designs. Occupants of the Three E-com Center includes Bangkok Bank, Prime Metro BMD Corporation, Alorica, and Amazon. Alorica by the Bay and Amazon occupies multiple floors within the towers. The Four E-Com Center began construction 2016 was topped-off in 2019, and was initially planned to open in 2020, however, due to the effects of the COVID-19 pandemic in the country, the building's opening was delayed and expected to be completed within 2021.

The Five E-Com Center opened in 2015 and features a stacked building design. The tower houses contact centers and non-contact center tenants such as Altisource Business Solutions, Grieg Philippines Inc., Harte Hanks Philippines, Inc., Kuehne + Nagel, Inc., Pernod Ricard Philippines, Inc., Telstra, Tupperware Brands, PTT Petroleum, Royal Caribbean Group, Vestas, VXI, Xiamen Airlines and TeleTech.

Residential condominiums
The Mall of Asia has four residential condominium properties owned by SM Development Corporation (SMDC), SM Prime's residential development subsidiary, which include the Sea Residences, a six-tower complex; the Shell Residences, a four-tower complex; the Shore Residences, which has 3 separate residential condominium complexes, named Shore with 3 towers, Shore 2 with another 3 towers, and Shore 3 with 6 towers; the S Residences, a three-tower complex; and the Sail Residences, a four-tower development. The buildings were based on modern resort-themed architectural designs. In August 2021, SMDC unveiled a new residential project within the complex, the ICE Tower, an 844 unit residential-office (RESO) development, located across the EDSA Extension. The new residential development is expected to be completed within 2023–2024.

Transportation

The mall features a 20-seater tram service providing connectivity within the mall complex, and also features two transport terminals, providing transportation services to nearby areas in Metro Manila, and nearby Cavite, Batangas, and Laguna provinces. A bus stop is also located at the Globe Rotunda, fronting the Main Mall where city buses stop.

Adjacent to the convention center is the MetroStar Ferry Terminal ferry service to Cavite City. The terminal also serves as a passenger port to SM's tourism estate, the Hamilo Coast, in Nasugbu, Batangas.

In 2007, Philippine Export-Import Credit Agency (PhilEXIM) inaugurated the  ferry project between Cavite City and SM Mall of Asia. PhilEXIM President Virgilio R. Angelo stated that it guaranteed the loan of Metrostar Ferry, Inc. (Metrostar) for the government's Manila Bay Transport Project. Angelo stated that the ferry service would also open in the Cavite City-Luneta Boardwalk-Del Pan Bridge waterway. A ferry service is also inaugurated connecting SM Mall of Asia to the Bataan province.

A ferry service which will bring passengers to and from the upcoming Sangley Airport is being proposed.

Proposed Monorail in MOA. The SM Group and the Department of Transportation (DOTr) already have a contract in place for the construction of an integrated monorail system in Pasay City. This initiative by SM Prime would not only increase the complex's accessibility but will also benefit all parties involved—businesses, employees, locals, guests, and even tourists—by adding value.

Incidents and accidents

SM Mall of Asia Main Mall
 September 15, 2013: An 11-year-old boy was hurt when the ceiling of a mall's portion was damaged. The mall management said the damage of a portion of the mall's South Arcade ceiling was "due to rains and strong winds."
 March 30, 2014: A robbery and shootout occurred when the Martilyo Gang, a local criminal group specializing in robbing stores by smashing and stealing valuables using hammers, robbed a jewelry store using pipe wrenches instead of hammers at The SM Store's first floor. One suspect was arrested during the incident.
October 2, 2018: A ceiling at the second level of the main mall fell down in the midst of heavy rain on Tuesday afternoon, causing rainwater to runoff in front of a beauty shop. This was posted on Facebook through video by Cherry Mae Bernas. No one was hurt during the incident.

Concert grounds
 May 22, 2016: Five people died after taking alleged illegal drugs during a rave dance party organized by Close-Up entitled Forever Summer, which was headlined by Belgian DJ duo Dimitri Vegas and Like Mike at the concert grounds.
December 8, 2018: A number of unruly mallgoers forced the cancellation of the Coke Studios Christmas Concert at the mall's concert grounds the previous night. Coca-Cola in a statement said there was "pushing, jumping on the barricades and throwing bottles" by "portions" that threatened the safety of the entire crowd at the concert. Police on the next day said some 50 people were attended to by rescuers either for fainting or sustaining bruises. The concert would be rescheduled for the next year.

SM By the Bay
 October 10, 2014: A fire broke out at the MOA Eye at the SM by the Bay Amusement Park at around 10:07 am. The fire happened at least seven minutes, leaving 36 air-conditioned gondolas damaged. After the incident, the MOA Eye remained closed for at least seven days.
November 12, 2020: A cargo vessel was stranded at the mall's bayside area due to the strong winds brought by Typhoon Ulysses, according to Pasay Mayor Imelda Calixto-Rubiano. It also became a tourist attraction with people taking pictures of the said event.
February 12, 2022: A Dream Twister ride from the mall's amusement park has an electrical malfunction, no one was reported hurt or injured in the happened incident.

Events
 GMA Network held its countdown television special aired every New Year's Eve at the mall's bayside area from Celebrate to '08: The GMA New Year Countdown Special (2007–2008) to Kapuso Countdown to 2020: The GMA New Year Special (2019–2020).
 The Grand Mascot Parade was held every New Year's Day.
 The Philippine International Pyromusical Competition was held every year at the mall's bayside area since 2010 (except for the 10th edition in 2019, which happened in SM City Clark, in supporting the Manila Bay Rehabilitation Program by the Department of Environment and Natural Resources), which was known as World Pyro Olympics since 2005.
In September 2019, LIGA2: KONTRABIDA, a Mobile Legends: Bang Bang event was hosted at Music Hall with Nadine Lustre as ambassador.

References

External links

 
Shopping malls in Metro Manila
SM Prime
Shopping malls established in 2006